Giessenburg is a town in the Dutch province of South Holland. It is a part of the municipality of Molenlanden, and lies about 6 km west of Gorinchem.

Giessenburg was a separate municipality between 1957 and 1986. It was created in a merger of the municipalities Giessen-Nieuwkerk and Peursum.

In 2010, the town of Giessenburg had 4889 inhabitants. The built-up area of the town was 0.43 km², and contained 911 residences.
The statistical area "Giessenburg", which also can include the peripheral parts of the village, as well as the surrounding countryside, has a population of around 2900.

References

Populated places in South Holland
Former municipalities of South Holland
Molenlanden